Chrysosoma is a genus of flies in the family Dolichopodidae. It is a large genus, with more than 200 species distributed in the Old World and Oceania.

Species
Subgenus Chrysosoma Guérin-Méneville, 1831:

 Chrysosoma aeneum (Fabricius, 1805)
 Chrysosoma aequatoriale Parent, 1933
 Chrysosoma aestimabile Parent, 1933
 Chrysosoma aestimatum (Walker, 1859)
 Chrysosoma agrihan Bickel, 1994
 Chrysosoma akrikense Bickel in Bickel & Martin, 2022
 Chrysosoma alboguttatum Parent, 1930
 Chrysosoma aldrichi (De Meijere, 1913)
 Chrysosoma annuliferum Frey, 1924
 Chrysosoma annulitarse Parent, 1935
 Chrysosoma anoplum Meuffels & Grootaert, 1999
 Chrysosoma antennatum Becker, 1922
 Chrysosoma argenteomicans Parent, 1935
 Chrysosoma argentinoides Hollis, 1964
 Chrysosoma armillatum (Bigot, 1890)
 Chrysosoma arrogans Parent, 1934
 Chrysosoma austeni Parent, 1934
 Chrysosoma baiyerense Bickel in Bickel & Martin, 2022
 Chrysosoma bearni Parent, 1935
 Chrysosoma betege Bickel in Bickel & Martin, 2022
 Chrysosoma bicolor Parent, 1937
 Chrysosoma bicoloratum Grichanov, 1999
 Chrysosoma bifiguratum Becker, 1922
 Chrysosoma biseriatum Parent, 1932
 Chrysosoma bitcoin Bickel in Bickel & Martin, 2022
 Chrysosoma callosum Parent, 1929
 Chrysosoma cautum Parent, 1935
 Chrysosoma ceramense (De Meijere, 1913)
 Chrysosoma chinense Becker, 1922
 Chrysosoma chrysoleucum Frey, 1924
 Chrysosoma cilifemoratum Parent, 1933
 Chrysosoma cinctitarse (De Meijere, 1914)
 Chrysosoma clarkei Bickel, 1994
 Chrysosoma complicatum Becker, 1922
 Chrysosoma compressum Becker, 1922
 Chrysosoma confusum Parent, 1932
 Chrysosoma consimile Lamb, 1929
 Chrysosoma cooksoni Grichanov, 2021
 Chrysosoma cordieri Parent, 1934
 Chrysosoma corruptor Parent, 1933
 Chrysosoma crassum Yang & Saigusa, 2001
 Chrysosoma crinicorne (Wiedemann, 1824)
 Chrysosoma crypticum Becker, 1922
 Chrysosoma cupido (Walker, 1849)
 Chrysosoma cuprevittatum Bickel in Bickel & Martin, 2022
 Chrysosoma cyaneculiscutum Bickel & Wei, 1996
 Chrysosoma dalianum Yang & Saigusa, 2001
 Chrysosoma damingshanum Yang & Zhu, 2012
 Chrysosoma derisor Parent, 1934
 Chrysosoma digitatum Yang & Zhu, 2012
 Chrysosoma disparitarse Parent, 1935
 Chrysosoma diversicolor Parent, 1928
 Chrysosoma duplociliatum Parent, 1933
 Chrysosoma egens (Walker, 1859)
 Chrysosoma eminens Parent, 1935
 Chrysosoma excellens Parent, 1934
 Chrysosoma excitatum Frey, 1924
 Chrysosoma exilipes Parent, 1935
 Chrysosoma ferriferum Lamb, 1929
 Chrysosoma fissilamellatum Parent, 1939
 Chrysosoma fissum Becker, 1922
 Chrysosoma fistulatum Frey, 1924
 Chrysosoma flavipes (De Meijere, 1914)
 Chrysosoma flavitibiale (De Meijere, 1915)
 Chrysosoma floccosum Becker, 1922
 Chrysosoma fumifemoratum Bickel in Bickel & Martin, 2022
 Chrysosoma furcatum Wang, Zhu & Yang, 2014
 Chrysosoma fusiforme Frey, 1924
 Chrysosoma globiferum (Wiedemann, 1830)
 Chrysosoma graphicum Parent, 1935
 Chrysosoma gromieri Parent, 1929
 Chrysosoma guamense Bickel, 1994
 Chrysosoma guangdongense Zhang, Yang & Grootaert, 2003
 Chrysosoma guizhouense Yang, 1995
 Chrysosoma hainanum Yang, 1998
 Chrysosoma hangzhouense Yang, 1995
 Chrysosoma hebereri Parent, 1932
 Chrysosoma ignavum Becker, 1922
 Chrysosoma impressum Becker, 1922
 Chrysosoma impudens Parent, 1941
 Chrysosoma innatum Lamb, 1929
 Chrysosoma interruptum Becker, 1922
 Chrysosoma ituriense Parent, 1933
 Chrysosoma jingpinganum Yang & Saigusa, 2001
 Chrysosoma kusaiense Bickel, 1994
 Chrysosoma kuznetzovi Grichanov, 1997
 Chrysosoma kwangense Grichanov, 1999
 Chrysosoma lacteimicans Becker, 1923
 Chrysosoma leopoldi Parent, 1932
 Chrysosoma leucopogon (Wiedemann, 1824)
 Chrysosoma leucopygum (De Meijere, 1906)
 Chrysosoma leveri Parent, 1934
 Chrysosoma lilacinum (De Meijere, 1913)
 Chrysosoma liui Zhu & Yang, 2011
 Chrysosoma lofokiana Hollis, 1964
 Chrysosoma longum Yang & Zhu, 2012
 Chrysosoma loriseta Parent, 1934
 Chrysosoma lucare Bickel, 1994
 Chrysosoma luchunanum Yang & Saigusa, 2001
 Chrysosoma lucigena (Walker, 1859)
 Chrysosoma ludens Parent, 1935
 Chrysosoma lugubre Parent, 1935
 Chrysosoma macalpinei Bickel in Bickel & Martin, 2022
 Chrysosoma maculipenne Guérin-Méneville, 1831
 Chrysosoma maculiventre Parent, 1935
 Chrysosoma marginatum Becker, 1923
 Chrysosoma marianum Bickel, 1994
 Chrysosoma marki Hollis, 1964
 Chrysosoma medium Becker, 1922
 Chrysosoma meijeri Parent, 1932
 Chrysosoma melanochirum Bezzi, 1928
 Chrysosoma minusculum Becker, 1923
 Chrysosoma molestum Parent, 1934
 Chrysosoma mutilatum Parent, 1935
 Chrysosoma nanlingense Zhu & Yang, 2005
 Chrysosoma negrobovi Grichanov, 2021
 Chrysosoma nguemba Grichanov, 2004
 Chrysosoma nigrohalteratum Parent, 1939
 Chrysosoma nobile Parent, 1933
 Chrysosoma norma Curran, 1927
 Chrysosoma nudifrons (De Meijere, 1910)
 Chrysosoma nyingchiense Wang, Zhu & Yang, 2014
 Chrysosoma obscuratum (Van der Wulp, 1884)
 Chrysosoma obscuripes Parent, 1934
 Chrysosoma olegi Bickel in Bickel & Martin, 2021
 Chrysosoma orokaindi Bickel in Bickel & Martin, 2022
 Chrysosoma oromissim Bickel in Bickel & Martin, 2022
 Chrysosoma pacificum Parent, 1930
 Chrysosoma pagdeni Parent, 1937
 Chrysosoma palapes Hardy & Kohn, 1964
 Chrysosoma pallipilosum Yang & Saigusa, 2001
 Chrysosoma papuasinum (Bigot, 1890)
 Chrysosoma parvicucullatum Lamb, 1929
 Chrysosoma patellatum (Van der Wulp, 1881)
 Chrysosoma patelliferum (Thomson, 1869)
 Chrysosoma pauperculum Parent, 1933
 Chrysosoma pelagicum Bickel, 1994
 Chrysosoma petersi Dyte, 1957
 Chrysosoma pexum Becker, 1922
 Chrysosoma philippinense Frey, 1924
 Chrysosoma piriforme Becker, 1922
 Chrysosoma placens Parent, 1935
 Chrysosoma planitarse Becker, 1922
 Chrysosoma pomeroyi Curran, 1927
 Chrysosoma praelatum Becker, 1923
 Chrysosoma proliciens (Walker, 1857)
 Chrysosoma provocans Parent, 1934
 Chrysosoma pseudocallosum Bickel, 1994
 Chrysosoma quadratum (Van der Wulp, 1884)
 Chrysosoma ruyuanense Zhu & Yang, 2005
 Chrysosoma sagax Becker, 1922
 Chrysosoma salomonis Parent, 1929
 Chrysosoma saonekense (De Meijere, 1913)
 Chrysosoma schistellum Frey, 1924
 Chrysosoma serratum Yang & Saigusa, 2001
 Chrysosoma seticorne (Walker, 1864)
 Chrysosoma setosum (Van der Wulp, 1891)
 Chrysosoma shixingense Zhu & Yang, 2005
 Chrysosoma sigma Parent, 1935
 Chrysosoma simalurense (De Meijere, 1916)
 Chrysosoma singulare Parent, 1933
 Chrysosoma snelli Curran, 1927
 Chrysosoma solitarium Parent, 1935
 Chrysosoma spiniferum (Van der Wulp, 1896)
 Chrysosoma spinosum Wang, Zhu & Yang, 2014
 Chrysosoma splendidum (Van der Wulp, 1868)
 Chrysosoma stolyarovi Grichanov, 1998
 Chrysosoma stubbsi Grichanov, 1997
 Chrysosoma sumatranum Enderlein, 1912
 Chrysosoma tabubil Bickel in Bickel & Martin, 2022
 Chrysosoma tenuipenne Curran, 1927
 Chrysosoma terminatum Becker, 1922
 Chrysosoma tongbiguanum Yang & Zhu, 2012
 Chrysosoma townesi Bickel, 1994
 Chrysosoma trigonocercus Wei & Song, 2005
 Chrysosoma tuberculicorne (Macquart, 1855)
 Chrysosoma undulatum Becker, 1922
 Chrysosoma usherae Grichanov, 2021
 Chrysosoma vanbruggeni Grichanov, 2021
 Chrysosoma varitum Wei, 2006
 Chrysosoma viduum Lamb, 1929
 Chrysosoma vietnamense Wang, Zhang & Yang, 2012
 Chrysosoma vittatum (Wiedemann, 1819)
 Chrysosoma waigeense (De Meijere, 1913)
 Chrysosoma watutense Bickel in Bickel & Martin, 2022
 Chrysosoma woodi Parent, 1935
 Chrysosoma xanthodes Yang & Li, 1998
 Chrysosoma yapense Bickel, 1994
 Chrysosoma yunnanense Yang & Saigusa, 2001
 Chrysosoma zaitzevi Grichanov, 1997
 Chrysosoma zengchengense Zhu & Yang, 2005
 Chrysosoma zephyrus (Bigot, 1858)
 Chrysosoma zhoui Yang & Zhu, 2012

Subgenus Kalocheta Becker, 1923:
 Chrysosoma cucanum (Negrobov & Kulibali, 1983)
 Chrysosoma neoliberia Bickel, 1994
 Chrysosoma passivum (Becker, 1923)
 Chrysosoma villiersi (Vanschuytbroeck, 1970)

Subgenus Mesoblepharius Bigot, 1859:

 Chrysosoma aequilobatum Parent, 1933
 Chrysosoma albilimbatum (Bigot, 1890)
 Chrysosoma albocrinitatum Curran, 1925
 Chrysosoma angolense Parent, 1933
 Chrysosoma bacchi Dyte, 1957
 Chrysosoma bredoi Parent, 1933
 Chrysosoma consentium Curran, 1925
 Chrysosoma continuum  Curran, 1927
 Chrysosoma gemmeum (Walker, 1849)
 Chrysosoma hargreavesi Curran, 1927
 Chrysosoma hirsutulum Parent, 1933
 Chrysosoma katangense Curran, 1925
 Chrysosoma lavinia Curran, 1927
 Chrysosoma liberia Curran, 1929
 Chrysosoma mesotrichum (Bezzi, 1908)
 Chrysosoma pseudorepertum Grichanov, 1998
 Chrysosoma repertum Becker, 1923
 Chrysosoma schoutedeni Curran, 1927
 Chrysosoma senegalense (Macquart, 1834)
 Chrysosoma tanasijtshuki Grichanov, 1997
 Chrysosoma tractatum Becker, 1923
 Chrysosoma tricrinitum Parent, 1933
 Chrysosoma triumphator Parent, 1933
 Chrysosoma varivittatum Curran, 1925
 Chrysosoma vividum Becker, 1923
 Chrysosoma zinovjevi Grichanov, 1997

Unrecognised species:

 Chrysosoma adoptatum Parent, 1935
 Chrysosoma chromatipes (Bigot, 1890)
 Chrysosoma clarum (Walker, 1857)
 Chrysosoma clypeatum Parent, 1937
 Chrysosoma collucens (Walker, 1857)
 Chrysosoma derelictum (Walker, 1857)
 Chrysosoma doleschalli Enderlein, 1912
 Chrysosoma fuscopennatum (Bigot, 1890)
 Chrysosoma gilvipes Enderlein, 1912
 Chrysosoma illiciens (Walker, 1857)
 Chrysosoma insulanum Parent, 1939
 Chrysosoma leiopum (Doleschall, 1856)
 Chrysosoma moderatum (Walker, 1864)
 Chrysosoma nitens (Fabricius, 1805)
 Chrysosoma nubeculosum Becker, 1922
 Chrysosoma orciferum (Walker, 1859)
 Chrysosoma pauper Becker, 1922
 Chrysosoma posterum Becker, 1922
 Chrysosoma posticum (Walker, 1857)
 Chrysosoma prolectans (Walker, 1857)
 Chrysosoma robustum (Walker, 1857)
 Chrysosoma rubicundum Becker, 1922
 Chrysosoma setipes (Bigot, 1890)
 Chrysosoma subfascipennis (Curran, 1926)
 Chrysosoma subnotatum (Walker, 1857)
 Chrysosoma villipes (Rondani, 1875)

Species considered nomina nuda:
 Chrysosoma reficitum (Parent, 1934)

Species considered nomina dubia:
 Chrysosoma arduum (Parent, 1936)
 Chrysosoma benignum Parent, 1934
 Chrysosoma carum (Walker, 1849)
 Chrysosoma flexum (Loew, 1858)
 Chrysosoma laeve (Bigot, 1891)
 Chrysosoma praecipuum Parent, 1936
 Chrysosoma trigemmans (Walker, 1849)

Species that are now synonyms:
 Chrysosoma fasciatum (Guérin-Méneville, 1831): synonym of Chrysosoma aeneum (Fabricius, 1805)

Renamed species:
 Chrysosoma inerme (De Meijere, 1913) (originally Psilopus albopilosus inermis De Meijere, 1913, nec Psilopus inermis Loew, 1861): renamed to Chrysosoma anoplum Meuffels & Grootaert, 1999

Species moved to other genera:
 Chrysosoma asperum Parent, 1933: moved to Amblypsilopus, synonym of Amblypsilopus bevisi (Curran, 1927)
 Chrysosoma centrale Becker, 1923: moved to Amblypsilopus
 Chrysosoma insensibile Yang, 1995 moved to Amblypsilopus
 Chrysosoma ungulatum Parent, 1941: moved to Amblypsilopus

References

 Europe

Dolichopodidae genera
Sciapodinae
Asilomorph flies of Europe
Diptera of Australasia
Diptera of Asia
Taxa named by Félix Édouard Guérin-Méneville